The HTC Butterfly 3 is an Android smartphone manufactured and marketed by HTC. The device is an international variant of the HTC J Butterfly (HTV31) which was sold only in Japan and the Butterfly 3 was first launched in Taiwan on October 20, 2015. However, HTC later on stated that the Butterfly 3 will be sold only in Taiwan.

History
The J Butterfly was announced in May 2015 and the Butterfly 3 was announced along with the HTC One M9+ Supreme Camera Edition in a press conference held in Japan in September 2015. An international version was announced on 29 September 2015.

References

Butterfly 3
Android (operating system) devices
Mobile phones introduced in 2015
Discontinued smartphones
Mobile phones with infrared transmitter